iFlytek, styled as iFLYTEK, is a partially state-owned Chinese information technology company established in 1999. It creates voice recognition software and 10+ voice-based internet/mobile products covering education, communication, music, intelligent toys industries. State-owned enterprise China Mobile is the company's largest shareholder. The company is listed in the Shenzhen Stock Exchange with market capitalization at 25 billion RMB and it is backed by several state-owned investment funds.

In 2018, iFlytek signed a five-year collaboration agreement with the MIT Computer Science and Artificial Intelligence Laboratory. In 2020, the agreement was terminated due to concerns about human rights abuses of Uyghurs in Xinjiang.

U.S. sanctions 

In October 2019, iFlytek was sanctioned by the United States for allegedly using its technology for surveillance and human rights abuses in Xinjiang.

See also
Chinese speech synthesis

References

External links

Companies listed on the Shenzhen Stock Exchange
Information technology companies of China
Companies based in Hefei
Software companies established in 1999
Government-owned companies of China
Chinese companies established in 1999
Chinese brands